Many dinosaur specimens have been sold at auction, as part of the fossil trade. On average, around five dinosaur skeletons are put up for auction each year. These specimens are mostly purchased by wealthy private collectors and museums in Europe and the United States, though interest has been growing in China as well. The private sale of fossils has attracted criticism from paleontologists, as it presents an obstacle to fossils being publicly accessible to research.

Most countries where relatively complete dinosaur specimens are commonly found have laws against the export of fossils. The United States allows the sale of specimens collected on private property. As such, the majority of dinosaur fossils sold at auction were collected in the United States. However, smuggled specimens, particularly from Mongolia, also appear at auctions, often with falsified information on their source.

This list includes both specimens sold at auction and specimens that were scheduled to be sold at auction that have received news coverage.

Table

Specimens planned to be auctioned 
Some specimens planned to be auctioned did not sell, due to failing to meet the reserve price, legal challenges, or other obstacles. This list also includes specimens whose planned auction was announced, but for which information on whether it was sold is not available.

See also
Fossil trade
Antiquities trade

Footnotes

References 

Auction
Auction-related lists
Fossil trade